Hendek is a town and a district of Sakarya Province in the Marmara region of Turkey. The municipality was founded in 1907. The mayor of the city is Ali İnci (AKP).

Notable natives
 Gaffar Okkan (1952–2001), assassinated police chief 
 Süleyman Seba (1926–2014), former football player and long-time president of Beşiktaş J.K.

See also
Hacıkışla, Hendek
Elmayı Top Top Yapalım

References

External links
Hendek Infos
Hendek news
Hendek net
Hendek

Populated places in Sakarya Province
Districts of Sakarya Province
1907 establishments in the Ottoman Empire